The Taiwan KOM Challenge is a one-day road cycling race held annually in Taiwan. Created in 2012, the event is recognized as one of the most difficult cycling races in the world due having nearly 3500m of climbing over a 105 kilometer course. Vincenzo Nibali, the 2017 winner, holds the record for the fastest time, with a time of 3:19:54.

Winners

Men

Women

References

External links

 
 

Cycle races in Taiwan
Recurring sporting events established in 2012
2012 establishments in Taiwan